The 2017 Touring Car Endurance Series powered by Hankook was the second season of the Touring Car Endurance Series (TCES). Creventic was the organiser and promoter of the series.

Calendar

Entry list

Results and standings

Race results
Bold indicates overall winner.

See also
24H Series
2017 24H Series
2017 24H Proto Series

Notes

References

External links

Touring Car Endurance Series
Touring Car Endurance Series
Touring Car Endurance Series